The Privacy Act 1988 is an Australian law dealing with privacy.
Section 14 of the Act stipulates a number of privacy rights known as the Australian Privacy Principles (APPs). These principles apply to Australian Government and Australian Capital Territory agencies or private sector organizations contracted to these governments, organizations and small businesses who provide a health service, as well as to private organisations with an annual turnover exceeding AUD$3M (with some specific exceptions). The principles govern when and how personal information can be collected by these entities. Information can only be collected if it is relevant to the agencies' functions. Upon this collection, that law mandates that Australians have the right to know why information about them is being acquired and who will see the information. Those in charge of storing the information have obligations to ensure such information is neither lost nor exploited. An Australian will also have the right to access the information unless this is specifically prohibited by law.

2000 amendments
The Privacy Act was amended in 2000 to cover the private sector. Schedule 3 of the Privacy Act sets out a significantly different set of privacy principles, the National Privacy Principles (NPPs). These apply to private sector organizations (including not for profit organizations) with a turnover exceeding three million dollars, other than health service providers or traders in personal information. These principles extend to the transfer of personal information out of Australia.

2014 amendments
The Australian Privacy Principles (APPs) replaced the National Privacy Principles and Information Privacy Principles on 12 March 2014 via the Privacy Amendment (Enhancing Privacy Protection) Act 2012, which amended the Privacy Act 1988.

State legislation
Privacy principles that are substantially the same as the NPPs are also included in the legislation applying to the public sectors of some Australian States and Territories, namely the Information Privacy Act 2000 (Victoria), Information Act 2002 (Northern Territory), Personal Information Protection Act 2004 (Tasmania), and the Health Records and Information Privacy Act 2002 (New South Wales).

Administration
Australia's privacy principles, the APPs, depend upon the meaning of "personal information" (as defined in Privacy Act 1988 s6). This term has not yet been interpreted in a restrictive way as has been "personal data" in the UK Durant case.

The Privacy Act creates an Office of the Privacy Commissioner and a Privacy Commissioner in Australia.  Section 36 of the Act states that Australians may appeal to this Commissioner if they feel their privacy rights have been compromised, unless the privacy was violated by an organization that has its own dispute resolution mechanisms under an approved Privacy Code.  The Commissioner, who may decide to investigate complaints and in some cases must investigate, can under section 44 obtain relevant evidence from other people. There is no appeal to a Court or Tribunal against decisions of the Commissioner except in very limited  circumstances. Section 45 of the Privacy Act allows the Commissioner to interview the people themselves, and the people might have to swear an oath to tell the truth.  Anyone who fails to answer the Commissioner may be subject to a fine of up to $2,000 and/or year-long imprisonment (under section 65).  Under section 64 of the Privacy Act, the Commissioner is also given immunity against any lawsuits that he or she might be subjected to for the carrying out of their duties.

If the Commissioner will not hear a complaint, an Australian may receive legal assistance under section 63.  If a complaint is taken to the Federal Court of Australia, in certain circumstances others may receive legal assistance.

Review of the Act
The Australian Law Reform Commission completed an inquiry into the state of Australia's privacy laws in 2008. The Report entitled For Your Information: Australian Privacy Law and Practice recommended significant changes be made to the Privacy Act, as well as the introduction of a statutory cause of action for breach of privacy. The Australian Government committed in October 2009 to implementing a large number of the recommendations that the Australian Law Reform Commission had made in its report.

See also
Telecommunications (Interception and Access) Act 1979
Telecommunications Act 1997
Surveillance Devices Act 2004

References

External links
 Privacy Act 1988 in the Federal Register of Legislation
 Full text of the Privacy Act 1988, Australasian Legal Information Institute, URL accessed 6 May 2006.
 National Privacy Principles, Office of the Australian Information Commissioner, URL accessed 12 June 2011.
 Information Privacy Principles, Office of the Australian Information Commissioner, URL accessed 12 June 2011.

1988 in Australian law
Acts of the Parliament of Australia
Privacy legislation